Cycas taiwaniana is a species of plant in the genus Cycas. The species is native to Yunnan, Guangdong, Guangxi and Fujian in China. Although the specific epithet, taiwaniana, is derived from Taiwan, where the original type specimens were found, it is not naturally distributed in Taiwan. Instead of C. taiwaniana, the original type specimens used for describing C. taiwaniana, had been reclassified under another species, Cycas taitungensis.

References

External links
The Cycad Pages: Cycas taiwaniana 

taiwaniana
Endemic flora of China
Flora of Fujian
Flora of Guangdong
Flora of Guangxi
Flora of Yunnan
Endangered flora of Asia
Plants described in 1893